Adolphe Sylvain (1920–1991) was a French-Tahitian photographer, best known for his black-and-white photographs of Tahiti and Tahitian models.

French photographers
1920 births
1991 deaths